Sasha Deborah Turner is a Jamaican-American historian who is an Associate Professor of History of at the Johns Hopkins University Department of the History of Medicine. Her research considers the history of the Caribbean, with a particular focus on enslavement and colonialism. She is Co-President of the Coordinating Council for Women in History.

Early life and education 
Turner is from the West Indies. She was an undergraduate student at the University of the West Indies, where she majored in history. She moved to the United Kingdom for her graduate studies. She started as a master's student in public health at the University of Cambridge, and stayed there to complete her doctoral research. Her research considered gender and 18th century Jamaican sugar estates. Turner was a postdoctoral fellow at Rutgers University, Washington University in St. Louis, Pennsylvania State University and Yale University.

Research and career 
In 2010, Turner was made an Assistant Professor at Quinnipiac University. She moved to Johns Hopkins University as an Associate Professor of History. Turner studies the history of the Caribbean. In particular, she studies the lives of women and children, and how they are impacted by racial and gender stereotypes. She has studied the role of emotion in enslavement and colonialism. Whilst writing her first book, Contested Bodies: Pregnancy, Childrearing and Slavery in Jamaica, Turner became horrified by the high rates of infant mortality amongst Caribbean colonies. She started to investigate how enslaved women handled the deaths of their children. She explored these themes in her essays on black maternal grief.

Turner is a contributor to the African American Intellectual History Society.

Awards and honors 
 Berkshire Conference of Women Historians Book Prize
 Southern Association for Women Historians Julia Spurill Prize
 Latin American and Caribbean Section of the Southern Historical Association Murdo J. McLeod Prize
 African American Intellectual History Society Maria Stewart Prize
 Association for Black Women's History/Association of African American Life and History Letitia Woods Brown Memorial Prize
 Southern Historical Association of Women Historians A. Elizabeth Taylor Prize 
 North American Conference on British Studies Judith R. Walkowitz Prize
 Latin American and Caribbean Section of the Southern Historical Association Kimberly Hanger Prize

Selected publications

References 

Johns Hopkins University faculty
Alumni of the University of Cambridge
American women historians
Living people
Year of birth missing (living people)
Jamaican historians
Jamaican emigrants to the United States
Expatriate academics in the United States
University of the West Indies alumni
Quinnipiac University faculty
African-American historians
21st-century American historians
Washington University in St. Louis fellows
Yale University fellows